The Taça Brasil de Futsal (Portuguese for Brazil Futsal Trophy) is a Brazilian futsal championship. It was the only futsal competition in Brazil until 1996, when the Liga Futsal started.

The Taça Brasil is one of the most traditional Brazilian Futsal Confederation (CBFS) competitions. The competition reunites representatives of the states (mostly of them are the state champions).

The first edition was disputed in 1968, in Lages, Santa Catarina state, and the champion was Carioca from Rio de Janeiro state, with Palmeiras from São Paulo finishing as the runner-up. Until 1980, the tournament took place every two years. Since 1981, the competition is disputed annually.

List of winners

Titles by team

Titles by state

External links
 Confederação Brasileira de Futebol de Salão

Futsal competitions in Brazil
Brazil